Dunkirk is an unincorporated community in Crawford County, Kansas, United States.

History
A post office was opened in Dunkirk in 1915, and remained in operation until it was discontinued in 1919. Dunkirk was originally a mining community with coal mines operated by the Wier Coal Company.

References

Further reading

External links
 Crawford County maps: Current, Historic, KDOT

Unincorporated communities in Crawford County, Kansas
Unincorporated communities in Kansas